Chrysallida decorata is a species of sea snail, a marine gastropod mollusk in the family Pyramidellidae, the pyrams and their allies. The species is one of a number within the genus Chrysallida.

Description
The shell is longitudinally plicated. The wider interstices are spirally striated. The plicae continue to the base. The six whorls of the teleoconch are slightly convex, with a well-impressed suture and a small plait. The length of the shell measures 3 mm.

Distribution
The vast majority of this species is mainly distributed within the Red Sea.

References

External links
 To World Register of Marine Species

decorata
Gastropods described in 1849